Lf or LF may refer to:

Arts and entertainment
 LF (album), by Raymond Lam
 Left fielder, a position in baseball
 Laxius Force, a role-playing video game trilogy
 Libby Folfax, a character in Jimmy Neutron: Boy Genius
 Lifeforce (film), a 1985 film directed by Tobe Hooper
 Salamander (video game), an arcade game retitled Life Force

Companies and organisations
 LeapFrog Enterprises, an educational toy company
 Lebanese Forces, a Lebanese political party 
 Li & Fung, a company of Hong Kong
 Linux Foundation, a non-profit organization for the promotion of Linux
 LoveFilm, UK-based provider of home video and video game rental through DVD-by-mail and streaming video on demand
 People's Life First, a Japanese political party
 FlyNordic (IATA airline designator LF), a defunct Swedish airline
 Nippon Broadcasting System, also known as JOLF, a radio station in Tokyo, Japan

Places
 Lakeland, Florida
 Livermore Falls, Maine
 Lambeau Field, a stadium in Green Bay, Wisconsin and the home of the Green Bay Packers

Science and technology

Biology and medicine
 Lactoferrin, a protein
 Lateral flow test, an immunologic test
 Lymphatic filariasis, a disease common in tropical regions
 L.f., taxonomic author abbreviation of Carl Linnaeus the Younger (1741–1783), Swedish naturalist

Logic and information theory
 Lexical function, a tool for the description of semantic relationships
 Logical form, the abstract form of a set of sentences in logic
 Logical form (linguistics), a level of syntactic representation
 Logical framework, in automated theorem proving
 LF (logical framework), a particular logical framework

Other uses in science and technology
 Missile launch facility, a structure used for launching ballistic missiles
 Limestone filler, used in cement and concrete fabrication
 Line feed character, in typing and computing; also called newline, line break, or end-of-line
 Load factor (disambiguation)
 Logic File, a logic file category
 London forces, a type of intermolecular forces
 Low frequency, a radio frequency between 30 and 300 kHz

Other uses
 Laissez-faire, a concept in economics
 Left fielder, a defensive position in baseball
 Left Front (disambiguation)
 Lexus LF, a concept automobile
 LF-routes, a network of long-distance cycling routes in the Netherlands and Belgium.